The 1890 Philadelphia Athletics (alternately known as the Quakers) baseball team was a member of the short lived Players' League. They compiled a 68–63 record and finished in fifth place in the league. After the season, the league folded, and the Athletics were admitted into the American Association as a replacement for the AA version of the Philadelphia Athletics, a team expelled after the 1890 season.

Spring training 

The team traveled south for spring training in March 1890, and trained in Gainesville, Florida at The Ballpark.

Regular season

Season standings

Record vs. opponents

Opening Day lineup

Roster

Player stats

Batting

Starters by position 
Note: Pos = Position; G = Games played; AB = At bats; H = Hits; Avg. = Batting average; HR = Home runs; RBI = Runs batted in

Other batters 
Note: G = Games played; AB = At bats; H = Hits; Avg. = Batting average; HR = Home runs; RBI = Runs batted in

Pitching

Starting pitchers 
Note: G = Games pitched; IP = Innings pitched; W = Wins; L = Losses; ERA = Earned run average; SO = Strikeouts

References 

 1890 Philadelphia Athletics team page at Baseball Reference

Philadelphia Athletics (PL) season